Sight For Sore Ears is the first video album from the rock band Poison, featuring all the Poison music videos from the first two albums, Look What the Cat Dragged In and Open Up and Say...Ahh! and also features behind the scenes footage and in depth interviews. The video compilation received gold certification. It was re-released on DVD in 2001 as part of Poison Greatest Video Hits.
It has also been certified by CAN gold.

Track listing

 "Cry Tough"
 "I Want Action"
 "Talk Dirty To Me"
 "I Won't Forget You"
 "Good Love (Montage)"
 "Nothin' but a Good Time"
 "Fallen Angel"
 "Every Rose Has Its Thorn"
 "Your Mama Don't Dance"

Band members
 Bret Michaels - lead vocals
 C.C. DeVille - lead guitar
 Bobby Dall - bass
 Rikki Rockett - drums

Certifications

References

External links
Official website
Poison F@n Club

1989 video albums
Music video compilation albums
Poison (American band) video albums
1989 compilation albums